Sir Syed Memorial School is an English-medium CBSE-affiliated school in Bihar, India, established in 1992. It is named after educator and philosopher Syed Ahmed Khan

It has approximately 1,200 students and is run by the Minority Upliftment Society, whose goal is to provide an education to children of poor families in rural areas.

External links

 

Schools in Bihar
Education in Gaya, India
1992 establishments in Bihar
Educational institutions established in 1992